Chityal is a municipality in Nalgonda district of the Indian state of Telangana. It is located in Chityal mandal of Nalgonda division.

Geography
It has an average elevation of 304 metres (1000 ft).
It is around 72 km from Hyderabad, 28 km from Nalgonda.

History

In Kakatiya Dynasty, Chityala named Chittala Sangyapuram. The details of this are available in Gram Panchayat Office. In 1984, for laying railway track the inscription pillar found along with 800-year-old Anjaneya Swami Temple.

Nearest Cities 
Nalgonda-27 km

Suryapet-61 km

Hyderabad-74 km

References

Villages in Nalgonda district
 Mandal headquarters in Nalgonda district